In Roman religion, the genius (plural geniī) is the individual instance of a general divine nature that is present in every individual person, place, or thing. Much like a guardian angel, the genius would follow each man from the hour of his birth until the day he died. For women, it was the Juno spirit that would accompany each of them.

Nature
Each individual place had a genius (genius loci) and so did powerful objects, such as volcanoes. The concept extended to some specifics: the genius of the theatre, of vineyards, and of festivals, which made performances successful, grapes grow, and celebrations succeed, respectively. It was extremely important in the Roman mind to propitiate the appropriate genii for the major undertakings and events of their lives. 

 Thus man, following the dictates of his heart, venerated something higher and more divine than he could find in his own limited individuality, and brought to "this great unknown of himself" offerings as a god; thus compensating by veneration for the indistinct knowledge of his divine origin. 

The Christian theologian Augustine equated the Christian soul with the Roman genius, citing Varro as attributing the rational powers and abilities of every human being to their genius.

Specific genii

Although the term genius might apply to any divinity whatsoever, most of the higher-level and state genii had their own well-established names. Genius applied most often to individual places or people not generally known; that is, to the smallest units of society and settlements, families and their homes. Houses, doors, gates, streets, districts, tribes, each one had its own genius. The supreme hierarchy of the Roman gods, like that of the Greeks, was modelled after a human family. It featured a father, Jupiter, who was also the supreme divine unity, and a mother, Juno, queen of the gods. These supreme unities were subdivided into genii for each individual family; hence, the genius of each female, representing the female reproductive power, was a Juno. The male power was a Jupiter.

The Juno was worshipped under many titles:
Iugalis, "of marriage"
Matronalis, "of married women"
Pronuba, "of brides"
Virginalis, "of virginity"

Genii were often viewed as protective spirits, as one would propitiate them for protection. For example, to protect infants one propitiated a number of deities concerned with birth and childrearing: Cuba ("lying down to sleep"), Cunina ("of the cradle") and Rumina ("of breast-feeding"). Certainly, if those genii did not perform their proper function well, the infant would be in danger.

Hundreds of lararia, or family shrines, have been discovered at Pompeii, typically off the atrium, kitchen or garden, where the smoke of burnt offerings could vent through the opening in the roof. Each lararium features a panel fresco containing the same theme: two peripheral figures (Lares) attend on a central figure (family genius) or two figures (genius and juno) who may or may not be at an altar. In the foreground is one or two serpents crawling toward the genius through a meadow motif. Campania and Calabria preserved an ancient practice of keeping a propitious house snake, here linked with the genius. In another, unrelated fresco (House of the Centenary) the snake-in-meadow appears below a depiction of Mount Vesuvius and is labelled Agathodaimon, "good daimon", where daimon must be regarded as the Greek equivalent of genius.

History of the concept

Origin

The English term is borrowed from Lat. genius m. "household guardian spirit"; earlier, "innate male power of a race or clan", deriving from the Indo-European root *g̑enh₁-, "give birth, produce", which is also reflected in Lat. gignō "give birth" and gēns, gentis f. "tribe, people".

The genius appears explicitly in Roman literature as early as Plautus, where one character jests that the father of another is so avaricious that he uses cheap Samian ware in sacrifices to his own genius, so as not to tempt the genius to steal it. In this passage, the genius is not identical to the person, as to propitiate oneself would be absurd, and yet the genius also has the avarice of the person; that is, the same character, the implication being, like person, like genius.

Horace, writing when the first emperor was introducing the cult of his own genius, describes the genius as "the companion which controls the natal star; the god of human nature, in that he is mortal for each person, with a changing expression, white or black".

Imperial genii

Octavius Caesar on return to Rome after the final victory of the Roman Civil War at the Battle of Actium appeared to the Senate to be a man of great power and success, clearly a mark of divinity. In recognition of the prodigy they voted that all banquets should include a libation to his genius. In concession to this sentiment he chose the name Augustus, capturing the numinous meaning of English "august." The household cult of the Genius Augusti dates from this period. It was propitiated at every meal along with the other household numina. Thus began the tradition of the Roman imperial cult, in which Romans worshipped the genius of the emperor rather than the person.

If the genius of the imperator, or commander of all troops, was to be propitiated, so was that of all the units under his command. The provincial troops expanded the idea of the genii of state; for example, from Roman Britain have been found altars to the genii of Roma, Roma aeterna, Britannia, and to every legion, cohors, ala and centuria in Britain, as well as to the praetorium of every castra and even to the vexillae. Inscriptional dedications to genius were not confined to the military. From Gallia Cisalpina under the empire are numerous dedications to the genii of persons of authority and respect; in addition to the emperor's genius principis, were the geniuses of patrons of freedmen, owners of slaves, patrons of guilds, philanthropists, officials, villages, other divinities, relatives and friends. Sometimes the dedication is combined with other words, such as "to the genius and honor" or in the case of couples, "to the genius and Juno."

Surviving from the time of the empire hundreds of dedicatory, votive and sepulchral inscriptions ranging over the entire territory testify to a floruit of genius worship as an official cult. Stock phrases were abbreviated: GPR, genio populi Romani ("to the genius of the Roman people"); GHL, genio huius loci ("to the genius of this place"); GDN, genio domini nostri ("to the genius of our master"), and so on. In 392 AD with the final victory of Christianity Theodosius I declared the worship of the Genii, Lares and Penates to be treason, ending their official terms. The concept, however, continued in representation and speech under different names or with accepted modifications.

Roman iconography

Coins
The genius of a corporate social body is often a cameo theme on ancient coins: a denarius from Spain, 76–75 BC, featuring a bust of the GPR (Genius Populi Romani, "Genius of the Roman People") on the obverse; an aureus of Siscia in Croatia, 270–275 AD, featuring a standing image of the GENIUS ILLVR (Genius Exercitus Illyriciani, "Genius of the Illyrian Army") on the reverse; an aureus of Rome, 134–138 AD, with an image of a youth holding a cornucopia and patera (sacrificial dish) and the inscription GENIOPR, genio populi Romani, "to the genius of the Roman people," on the reverse.

Modern-era representations

See also
 
 Daemon
 Di Penates
 Jinn
 Kami
 Qareen
 Religion in ancient Rome
 Tutelary deity
 Yidam

References

Further reading

External links

 
 
 

Ancient Roman religion
Roman deities
Tutelary deities